Ectobius pallidus, the tawny cockroach, is a species of non-cosmopolitan cockroach in the family Ectobiidae. It occurs in southern England, Belgium, France, the Netherlands, Germany, Switzerland, Italy, Spain and Portugal; in North Africa: Algeria and Tunisia.  It is now known to be introduced into North America.

Subspecies
Subspecies include:
Ectobius pallidus chopardi Adelung, 1917
Ectobius pallidus minor Ramme, 1923
Ectobius pallidus pallidus (Turton, 1806) – type 
Ectobius pallidus punctulatus (Fieber, 1853)

See also
 
 List of Orthoptera and allied insects of Great Britain

References

Insects of Europe
Cockroaches
Insects described in 1798